The Outer Worlds is a 2019 action role-playing game developed by Obsidian Entertainment and published by Private Division. The game was released for PlayStation 4, Windows, and Xbox One in October 2019, with a Nintendo Switch version released in June 2020. The game received generally favorable reviews from critics and sold over four million units by August 2021.

A sequel, The Outer Worlds 2, was announced in June 2021.

Gameplay 

The Outer Worlds is an action role-playing video game featuring a first-person perspective. In the early stages of the game, the player can create their character and unlock a ship, which acts as the game's central hub space. Though the player cannot control their ship directly, it serves as a fast travel point to access different areas in the game and acts as the player's persistent inventory space. The player can encounter and recruit non-player characters (NPCs) as companions who have their own personal missions and stories. When accompanying the player, the companions act as an aid in combat. Each companion has their own individual skills and special attacks, and they can develop their own skill specialization. When exploring, the player can bring up to two companions alongside them while the rest stay on the ship. The player can make numerous dialogue decisions which can influence the game's branching story. They can respond to NPCs in various ways, such as acting heroically, maniacally, or moronically.

During combat situations, the player can use various weapon types such as melee and firearms, which have three ammo types: light, heavy and energy. These weapons can be customized to add elemental damage. The player can use stealth or social skills (persuasion, lying and intimidation) to avoid combat altogether. As the player progresses, they gain experience points, which the player and their companions can use to level up and unlock new skills. The player can develop their technical skills, which are further divided into three categories: Science, Medical, and Engineering. For instance, the player can use a shrink ray to shrink down an enemy. The player is able to invest points into these skills, which will unlock new perks that enhance combat efficiency. The player can also enter a "Tactical Time Dilation" state, which slows down time and reveals opponents' health statistics, granting the player tactical advantages. As the player leads their companions, they improve their companions' combat strength and resilience. The player can gain a "flaw" that occurs when the player fails repeatedly in certain gameplay segments. Flaws impede the player in some way, but give additional perks and advantages.

Plot

Setting 
The game is set in an alternate future that diverged in 1901, when U.S. President William McKinley is not assassinated by Leon Czolgosz at the Pan-American Exposition. As a result, Theodore Roosevelt never succeeded him, and the great business trusts of the era were never broken up, leading to a hyper-corporate, class-centric society dominated by the power of megacorporations, which, by the distant future, have begun to colonize space and terraform alien planets to varying results. Hundreds of Earth residents, lured by the promise of a fresh start, sign up for the chance to travel to this new frontier.

Among them is Halcyon, a small, six-planet star system. Traveling to Halcyon requires both the usage of advanced spacecraft with a faster-than-light skip-drive and a ten-year cryosleep for the colonists. In 2285, two colony ships were dispatched to colonize Halcyon — the Hope and the Groundbreaker. While the Groundbreaker successfully arrived in Halcyon, colonizing the planets Terra 1 (later renamed Monarch) and Terra 2, the Hope and its cargo mysteriously disappeared in transit, slipping into myth among the citizens of Halcyon. The Groundbreaker, meanwhile, goes into permanent orbit near Terra 2, with the original crew and their descendants converting the ship into an independent port and armored citadel.

Synopsis 
In 2355, the Hope is discovered drifting on the outskirts of the Halcyon system by mad scientist Phineas Vernon Welles, who manages to safely revive one of the passengers (the "Stranger"). Welles informs the Stranger that the Halcyon colonies have fallen on hard times due to the incompetence and greed of the various mega-corporations (referred to collectively as "The Board") that govern every aspect of life in Halcyon. Due to the after-effects of prolonged cryosleep, the Stranger has substantially higher mental and physical abilities, including the ability to briefly slow time. Welles tasks the Stranger with securing the resources needed to revive the remaining Hope colonists, who he believes hold the key to Halcyon's salvation.

Welles jettisons the Stranger in an escape pod onto Terra 2, where a contact, smuggler Alex Hawthorne, is waiting. Unfortunately, the Stranger's pod lands on Hawthorne, killing him instantly (since Hawthorne didn't listen to Welles' instructions properly). The Stranger commandeers Hawthorne's ship, the Unreliable, which is piloted by an artificial intelligence named ADA. Needing a new power converter to repair the aging ship, the Stranger ventures into Edgewater, a company town on the verge of collapse due to a group of unsatisfied workers (referred to as "dissenters") refusing to work until they get better treatment. The mayor of Edgewater, Reed Tobson, hires the Stranger to sabotage a nearby geothermal plant to cut off the dissenters' power; the player must then decide whether to go through with his request, side with the dissenters by cutting off power to Edgewater, or manipulate events so Reed is forced to leave Edgewater in exchange for the dissenters' return.

As the Stranger repairs their new ship and starts to explore Halcyon, they can recruit other helpful individuals to form a crew, starting with Edgewater's bashful town mechanic Parvati Holcomb. Other members include cynical pirate Dr. Ellie Fenhill, loyal-but-naive ship's hand Felix Millstone, overzealous vicar Maximillian DeSoto, alcoholic monster-hunter and mercenary Nyoka Ramnarim-Wentworth III, and a modified cleaning robot named SAM. The Stranger also learns that Welles is wanted by the Board for acts of alleged terrorism and illegal experimentation, and must make another choice: continue to help Welles or betray him to the Board and assist them with his capture.

After leaving Terra 2, the Stranger heads to Monarch, a colonized moon orbiting the gas giant Olympus, where an information broker holds the location of a batch of dimethyl sulfoxide, a chemical Welles needs to revive the remaining colonists. As landing on Monarch is prohibited due to a Board trade embargo, the Stranger must first retrieve a passkey from aboard the Groundbreaker. The Stranger then lands in the town of Stellar Bay to discover that the abandoned colony is divided between two factions - Monarch Stellar Industries (MSI), a rogue corporate entity with a collectivist mindset that seeks a new relationship with the Board, and the anarchist Iconoclasts, who want to build a new society free from its influence. After helping the Broker regain control of Monarch's airwaves so he can collect the intel, the Stranger witnesses a Board gunship crash nearby. Both MSI and the Iconoclasts ask the Stranger to retrieve the gunship's weapons; the Stranger can choose to give the weapons to either side, triggering all-out war, or try to negotiate peace between the two factions.

With the Broker's intel, Welles directs the Stranger to Halcyon's wealthy capital Byzantium, where the Minister of Earth, Aloysius Clarke, has just signed on a shipment of dimethyl sulfoxide. Tracking down Clarke to his townhouse, the Stranger learns that Clarke has been placed under house arrest by Board Chairman Charles Rockwell, the true recipient of the chemicals. In Rockwell's private quarters, the Stranger discovers a video in which Rockwell announces the "Lifetime Employment Program"; the Board is conspiring to place the majority of the colonists in indefinite cryosleep, ostensibly in order to save humanity but in actuality to hoard the remaining food supplies for the wealthiest citizens. In order to store these frozen workers, the Hope colonists will be ejected into space, with the Hope turned into a vast cryogenic warehouse. The dimethyl sulfoxide is being used on human test subjects to attempt to recreate Welles' formula, in the hope that workers can be repeatedly pulled out of extended periods of suspended animation. The Stranger retrieves the chemicals, with or without killing the test subjects in the process.

Welles suggests using ADA and the Unreliables power to "skip" the Hope into the inner Halcyon system, placing it in orbit near his laboratory above Terra 2 so that he can begin the revival process. Sophia Akande, the Adjutant for the Board, instead proposes that the Stranger skip the Hope to Tartarus, a planet home to the Board's infamous Labyrinth prison complex, so that the Board can apprehend Welles and begin killing the colonists. The Stranger infiltrates the Hope and learns of what occurred during the ill-fated voyage; the Hopes skip drive developed an unforeseen fault, extending the planned 10-year mission to 60 years. As food rations ran out, some of the crew turned to cannibalizing the frozen colonists in order to survive, before staging a mutiny. The captain sealed the Hopes cryo-chambers and locked the ship on course for Halcyon, leaving everyone aboard to succumb to starvation. The Stranger also discovers that they were not the first colonist Welles attempted to reanimate; he actually tried at least twelve times prior with fatal results for the colonists involved.

Wiring ADA through to the Hopes control system, the Stranger skips the Hope either to Terra 2 or to Tartarus. Depending on where the Hope arrives in Halcyon, the ending diverges:

 If the Stranger chooses to skip the Hope themselves rather than ask ADA to do it, and the game has been played with low-intelligence settings, the game ends here. The Hope will be launched straight into Halcyon's Sun, destroying the ship and killing everyone aboard.
 If the Hope was skipped to Terra 2, the Board will apprehend Welles at his base and take him to the Labyrinth on Tartarus. The Stranger and their crew land on Tartarus and fight their way through the prison, learning Welles is being held hostage by either Akande or Rockwell. The Stranger must reach Welles and negotiate with his captor, forcing them to release him either peacefully or by force.
 If the Hope was skipped to Tartarus, an enraged Welles will travel to Tartarus himself and start a riot in the Labyrinth, taking Akande hostage in a bid to get to the Hope and her colonists. The Stranger and their crew land on Tartarus and fight their way through the prison. The Stranger must reach Welles and confront him, forcing him to release Akande either peacefully or by force.

Regardless of the outcome, the Stranger is informed that contact with Earth has been lost, and that a Board troopship en route to the home planet mysteriously disappeared in transit. The Stranger is offered leadership of the Halcyon colonies and allowed to shape humanity's future however they see fit. With Halcyon free of Earth's influence the colony is free to shape its own destiny, either under the Board's Lifetime Employment Program or under the freedom brought by the loss of the Board's influence. The Stranger and their crew go their separate ways as their individual fates are explained, and the story of the Unreliable slips into legend.

Development
The Outer Worlds was developed by Obsidian Entertainment and published by Take-Two Interactive's publishing label Private Division. Though Obsidian was in progress to be acquired by Microsoft Studios at the time of the game's announcement, the project had been under development before that point, and Take-Two had secured the publishing rights prior to Microsoft's acquisition offer.

Tim Cain and Leonard Boyarsky, the creators of the Fallout series, served as the game's directors, taking inspiration from Fallout, Firefly, Futurama, Deadwood, and True Grit. The duo directors described the game as "the combination of [Boyarsky's] dark morbidity and Tim's silliness", and they hoped to seek a balance between silliness and drama when creating the game's tone and narrative. Romantic options were initially considered, but the feature was eventually cut by the studio. The game's writers include Boyarsky and Megan Starks.

The game was in development since 2016, when Obsidian CEO Feargus Urquhart mentioned that a small number of people in the studio which included Cain and Boyarsky were working on "something completely new" in the Unreal Engine during an interview with Game Pressure. Obsidian later revealed the game's development in 2017. In December 2017, Private Division announced the project as their first slate of published games. It was announced at The Game Awards 2018 and was released for PlayStation 4, Windows, and Xbox One on October 25, 2019. In March 2019, it was announced that the game would release exclusively on the Epic Games Store and Microsoft Store, with its original Steam release being delayed until October 23, 2020. Fan response to the announcement was negative. A Nintendo Switch version was originally scheduled to be released on March 6, 2020, but was delayed to June 5 due to issues caused by the COVID-19 pandemic.

The game's first piece of downloadable content (DLC), Peril on Gorgon, was released on September 9, 2020. The second DLC, titled Murder on Eridanos, was released on March 17, 2021.

On March 7, 2023, a remastered version of the game called The Outer Worlds: Spacer's Choice Edition was released on Xbox Series X/S, PlayStation 5, and PC. The remaster was developed by Virtuos. Spacer’s Choice Edition introduces updated visuals and a higher level cap. It includes the base game and all DLC content. The remaster has been criticized for introducing stutter to the game and generally performing worse than the original.

Reception

The Outer Worlds received "generally favorable reviews" according to review aggregator Metacritic. Writing for Game Informer, Joe Juba praised the game for its soundtrack and for assembling an "excellent cast of voice performers," while Daniel Bloodworth of Easy Allies  found that the game was "incredibly well-written," but criticized the characters as appearing "rigid, lacking body language" during dialogue interactions. The reception to The Outer Worlds''' combat system was more mixed. Whereas the game drew acclaim from Josh Harmon of EGM for the depth of its melee combat mechanics, Tom Senior, writing for PC Gamer, noted that "combat isn't challenging, and enemies fit into worn categories."

The game was nominated for a number of awards for its writing, voice acting and visual design – taking home five awards from the 2020 NAVGTR Awards, and winning the Big Apple Award for Best Game of the Year at the 2020 New York Game Awards.

By February 2020, the game sold had over two million units. By May 2021, the game had sold over three million units. By August 2021, the game had sold over four million units.

Awards

Sequel
On 13 June 2021, at Xbox and Bethesda's joint E3 presentation, The Outer Worlds 2'' was announced for Xbox Series X/S and PC.

References

External links
 

2019 video games
Action role-playing video games
Alternate history video games
Fiction set in the 24th century
Interactive Achievement Award winners
LGBT-related video games
Nebula Award for Best Game Writing-winning works
Nintendo Switch games
Obsidian Entertainment games
PlayStation 4 games
Private Division games
Retrofuturistic video games
Science fiction video games
Single-player video games
Space Western video games
Take-Two Interactive games
Unreal Engine games
Video games developed in the United States
Video games postponed due to the COVID-19 pandemic
Video games featuring protagonists of selectable gender
Video games set in the 24th century
Video games set on fictional planets
Video games with alternate endings
Windows games
Xbox Cloud Gaming games
Xbox One games
GLAAD Media Award for Outstanding Video Game winners
D.I.C.E. Award for Role-Playing Game of the Year winners
Assassination of William McKinley